Space, Inc. is a 2003 anthology of science fiction short-stories revolving around careers in space. It is the first anthology edited by Julie E. Czerneda, for which she won a 2004 Prix Aurora Award.

Contents

References

External links 

2003 anthologies
Science fiction anthologies
DAW Books books